The Battle of Blue Licks, fought on August 19, 1782, was one of the last battles of the American Revolutionary War. The battle occurred ten months after Lord Cornwallis's surrender at Yorktown, which had effectively ended the war in the east. On a hill next to the Licking River in what is now Robertson County, Kentucky (then Fayette County, Virginia), a force of about 50 Loyalists along with 300 indigenous warriors ambushed and routed 182 Kentucky militiamen, who were partially led by Daniel Boone. It was the last victory for the Loyalists and natives during the frontier war. British, Loyalist and Native forces would engage in fighting with American forces once more the following month in Wheeling, West Virginia, during the Siege of Fort Henry.

Background

Caldwell's expedition
Although the main British Army under Lord Cornwallis had surrendered at Yorktown in October 1781, virtually ending the war in the east, fighting on the western frontier continued. Aided by the British garrison at Fort Detroit, Indians north of the Ohio River redoubled their efforts to drive the American settlers out of the western frontier of Kentucky County, Virginia.

In July 1782 a meeting took place at the Shawnee villages near the headwaters of the Mad River in the Ohio Country, with Shawnee, Mingo, Wyandot, Miami, Odawa, Ojibwe and Potawatomi tribals in attendance. As a result, 150 men from the Loyalist Butler's Rangers unit under the command of Captain William Caldwell and approximately 1,100 Indian warriors led by British Indian Department officials Alexander McKee, Simon Girty, and Matthew Elliott set out to attack Wheeling, on the upper Ohio River. This was one of the largest forces sent against American settlements during the war.

The expedition was called off, however, when scouts reported that a force under George Rogers Clark, whom the Indians feared more than any other commander, was about to invade the Ohio Country from Kentucky. Caldwell's army returned to the Mad River to oppose the invasion, but the attack never came. In fact, Clark did have a large armed boat patrolling the Ohio River, but he had no plans to invade. Most of the Indian warriors returned to their homes.

Bryan Station
Caldwell and about 50 Loyalists, supported by 300 Indians, crossed the Ohio River into Kentucky. They meant to surprise and destroy the settlement of Bryan Station, but the settlers discovered them and took shelter within their stockade. Caldwell and McKee's force laid siege to Bryan Station on August 15, killing all of the settlers' livestock and destroying their crops, but withdrew after two days when they learned that Kentucky militiamen were on the way. Five Indians were killed and two wounded during this short siege.

The militia arrived at Bryan Station on August 18. The force included about 47 men from Fayette County and another 135 from Lincoln County. The highest-ranking officer, Colonel John Todd of Fayette County, was in overall command, assisted by Lieutenant Colonel Daniel Boone, the famed frontiersman. Lieutenant Colonel Stephen Trigg and Major Hugh McGary led the Lincoln County contingent. Benjamin Logan, colonel of the Lincoln militia, was gathering men and had not yet arrived.

The militiamen could pursue the raiders immediately, to keep them from escaping, or they could wait for Logan to arrive with reinforcements. Daniel Boone advised waiting for Logan, who was only a day away, but others urged immediate action, pointing out that the enemy force had a 40-mile (60 km) lead on them. Boone felt compelled to go along, so the Kentuckians set out on horseback over an old buffalo trail before making camp at sunset.

Battle
On the morning of August 19, the Kentuckians reached the Licking River, near a spring and salt lick known as the Lower Blue Licks (today within Nicholas County). A few Indian scouts were seen watching them from across the river. Behind the scouts was a hill around which the river looped. Todd called a council and asked Daniel Boone, the most experienced woodsman, what he thought. Boone said he had been growing increasingly suspicious because of the obvious trail the Indians left. He felt the Indians were trying to lead them into an ambush.

Hugh McGary, known as both a fierce Indian fighter and an unstable hothead, urged immediate attack. When no one listened, he mounted his horse and rode across the ford, calling out, "Them that ain't cowards, follow me." The men immediately followed McGary, as did the officers, who hoped to restore order. Boone remarked, "We are all slaughtered men," and crossed the river.

Most of the men dismounted and formed a line of battle several rows deep. They advanced up the hill, Todd and McGary in the center, Trigg on the right, Boone on the left. As Boone had suspected, Caldwell's force was waiting on the other side, concealed in ravines. When the Kentuckians reached the summit, the Indians opened fire at close range with devastating accuracy. After only five minutes, the center and right of the Kentuckians' line fell back. Only Boone's men on the left managed to push forward. Todd and Trigg, easy targets on horseback, were shot dead.

The Kentuckians began to flee down the hill, fighting hand-to-hand with Indians who had flanked them. McGary rode up to Boone's company and told him everyone was retreating and that Boone was now surrounded. Boone ordered his men to retreat. He grabbed a riderless horse and ordered his 23-year-old son, Israel Boone, to mount it. Israel suddenly fell to the ground, shot through the neck. Boone realized his son was dead, mounted the horse and joined in the retreat. Caldwell had lost seven killed and ten wounded during ambush.

Aftermath
Although he had not taken part in the battle, George Rogers Clark, as senior commander, was widely condemned in Kentucky for allowing the Loyalist-Indian force to cross the river and court disaster at Blue Licks. In response, Clark launched a retaliatory raid across the Ohio River in November. His force consisted of more than 1,000 men, including Benjamin Logan and Daniel Boone. The Kentuckians destroyed five unoccupied Shawnee villages on the Great Miami River in the last major offensive of the American Revolution. No battles took place, since the Shawnees refused to stand and fell back to their villages on the Mad River.

Four years later, the Indian villages on the Mad River would be destroyed by Benjamin Logan at the outset of the Northwest Indian War. Hugh McGary confronted the Shawnee chief Moluntha and asked if he had been at Blue Licks. Moluntha nodded his head in agreement, and McGary killed him with a tomahawk. Moluntha had voluntarily and peacefully  surrendered, waving an American flag and a copy of the peace treaty he had signed earlier that year, in the belief that these would protect him. Colonel Logan immediately relieved McGary of his command and ordered him court-martialed for killing a prisoner. McGary was stripped of his commission for a year, but was otherwise unpunished.

Legacy
The Blue Licks battle site is commemorated at Blue Licks Battlefield State Park, on U.S. Route 68 between Paris and Maysville, just outside the town of Blue Licks Springs. The site includes a granite obelisk, burial grounds, and a museum. Every August, on the weekend closest to the 19th, a re-enactment and memorial service is held.

See also
 List of battles fought in Kentucky
 American Revolutionary War § Stalemate in the North. Places the Battle of Blue Licks in overall sequence and strategic context.
 Station (frontier defensive structure)

Notes

References
 Adams, Michael C. C. "An Appraisal of the Blue Licks Battle," Filson Club History Quarterly (2001) 75#2 pp 181–203. 

Faragher, John Mack. Daniel Boone: The Life and Legend of an American Pioneer. New York: Holt, 1992. .
Hammon, Neal O. Daniel Boone and the Defeat at Blue Licks. Minneapolis: The Boone Society, 2005. (Local history, no ISBN)
Lofaro, Michael A. Daniel Boone: An American Life. Lexington, Kentucky: University Press of Kentucky, 2003. .
Nelson, Larry L. A Man of Distinction among Them: Alexander McKee and the Ohio Country Frontier, 1754–1799. Kent, Ohio: Kent State University Press, 1999.  (hardcover).
Rice, Otis K. Frontier Kentucky. Lexington: University Press of Kentucky, 1975. .
Sugden, John. Blue Jacket: Warrior of the Shawnees. Lincoln and London: University of Nebraska Press, 2000. .

External links
Blue Licks Battlefield State Resort Park

1782 in Virginia
Conflicts in 1782
Blue Licks
Battles involving the United States
Battles involving Great Britain
Battles involving Native Americans
Blue Licks
Robertson County, Kentucky